Ruth Brown '65 (re-released as Softly) is an album released by vocalist Ruth Brown featuring tracks recorded in 1964 and originally released on the Mainstream label.

Reception

Allmusic awarded the album 3 stars and calling it "an underrated, nicely produced mid-'60s album".

Track listing
 "On the Good Ship Lollipop"  (Richard A. Whiting, Sidney Clare) – 2:57
 "Help a Good Girl Go Bad" (Alan Brandt, Bob Haymes) – 2:49
 "He's a Real Gone Guy"  (Nellie Lutcher) – 2:55
 "Porgy" (Jimmy McHugh, Dorothy Fields) – 3:00
 "What Am I Looking For" (George Devens) – 2:29
 "Here's That Rainy Day" (Jimmy Van Heusen, Johnny Burke) – 2:47
 "Hurry On Down" (Lutcher) – 2:39
 "Table for Two" (Kenny Rankin, Ruth Batchelor) – 2:56
 "What Do You Know (Que Sabes Tu)" (Billy Vaughn, Myrta Silva) – 2:59
 "Whispering Grass" (Fred Fisher, Doris Fisher) – 2:48
 "Watch It" (Dick Hyman) – 2:57
 "I Know Why" (Harry Warren, Mack Gordon) – 2:52

Personnel 
 Ruth Brown – vocal
Clark Terry, James Maxwell, Jimmy Sedlar – trumpet
Urbie Green, John Messner, Tony Studd, Britt Woodman – trombone
Ray Alonge, Richard Berg – French horn
Phil Bodner, Shelly Gold, John Hafer – oboe, clarinet, flute, alto saxophone, alto flute, piccolo, tenor saxophone
Sir Roland Hanna, Hank Jones – piano
Eugene Bianco – harp
Ariana Bronne, Fred Buldrini, Winston Collymore, Bernard Eichen, Lewis Eley, Leo Kruczek, Walter Malignaggi, Gerard Molfese, Elvira Morgenstern, Marvin Morgenstern, David Nadien, George Ockner, Raoul Poliakin, Michael Spivakowsky, Jack Zayde, Anthony Zungola – violin
David Markowitz, David Schwartz, Emanuel Vardi, Harry Zaratzian – viola
Allan Goldberg, Charles McCracken, George Ricci – cello
Barry Galbraith – guitar, electric guitar, electric bass
Richard Davis – bass
Archie Freeman  – drums 
Doug Allen, George Devens – percussion
Peter Matz – arranger, conductor

References 

1965 albums
Ruth Brown albums
Mainstream Records albums
Albums produced by Bob Shad